Rabindra Nath Bhattacharya (born January 11, 1937) is a mathematician/statistician at the University of Arizona. He works in the fields of probability theory and theoretical statistics where he has made fundamental contributions to long-standing problems in both areas. Most notable are (1) his solution to the multidimensional rate of convergence problem for the central limit theorem in his Ph.D. thesis published in the Bulletin of the American Mathematical Society and further elaborated in a research monograph written jointly with R. Ranga Rao and (2) the solution of the validity of the formal Edgeworth expansion in collaboration with J.K. Ghosh in 1978. He has also contributed significantly to the theory and application of Markov processes, including numerous co-authored papers on problems in groundwater hydrology with Vijay K. Gupta, and in economics with Mukul Majumdar. Most recently his research has focused on nonparametric statistical inference on manifolds and its applications.
 He is a co-author of three graduate texts and four research monographs. A comprehensive selection of Bhattacharya's work is available in a special 2016 Contemporary Mathematicians volume published by Birkhäuser. He is married to Bithika Gouri Bhattacharya, with a daughter, a son, and four grandchildren.

Early life and education 

Bhattacharya was born January 11, 1937, in his ancestral home Porgola, Barisal District, in the present country of Bangladesh. He received his B.S. and M.S. degree in 1956 and 1959 respectively from Presidency College and Calcutta University. He completed his Ph.D. under direction of Patrick Billingsley at the University of Chicago in 1967.

Academic career 
His first academic position was as assistant professor in the Department of Statistics at the University of California, Berkeley. In 1972, he accepted a position as associate professor in the Department of Mathematics at the University of Arizona in Tucson, and was promoted to full professor in 1977. In 1982, he moved to Indiana University, where he remained until his retirement in 2002. Upon retirement from Indiana University, he was re-appointed as a tenured full professor at the University of Arizona, retiring in May, 2018.

Awards and honors 
Bhattacharya has received many awards and honors, including Special Invited Papers in the Annals of Probability (1977) and the Annals of Applied Probability (1999). He is a Fellow of the Institute of Mathematical Statistics (1978). In 1988, he and M. Denker were invited by the German Mathematical Society to give DMV Seminar, Band 14, published by Birkhäuser as ″Asymptotic Statistics″. He received the prestigious Humboldt Prize (1993) and the Guggenheim Fellowship (2000). He also gave an invited talk, now referred to as a Medallion Lecture at the IMS Annual Meeting in Chicago (1996).

References

External links 
 Bhattacharya's web page at University of Arizona

1937 births
Living people
Fellows of the Institute of Mathematical Statistics
University of Arizona faculty
University of Chicago alumni
University of Calcutta alumni
Indian statisticians
20th-century Indian mathematicians